Gabriel Mascaro (born September 24, 1983) is a Brazilian visual artist and film director.

Biography

Gabriel Mascaro is a Brazilian filmmaker and visual artist. He started his career as a documentary-maker in 2008, with KFZ-1348 (co-directed by Marcelo Pedroso), Um Lugar ao Sol (High-rise, 2009) and Doméstica (Housemaids, 2013). That same year, he released the short film A Onda Traz, O Vento Leva (Ebb and Flow). 2014 saw his first narrative feature-film, Ventos de Agosto (August Winds), followed in 2015 by Boi Neon (Neon Bull), which brought widespread acclaim. He also created an installation entitled Não é Sobre Sapatos (This is not about shoes) and the photographic series Desamar (De-love).

Mascaro has received a great deal of critical attention and stirred the curiosity of film festival curators since debuting Boi Neon at the 72nd Venice Film Festival, where he won the Special Jury Prize, followed by special mention  in Toronto and 5 Best Film awards at the Festival of Rio, Warsaw, Adelaide, Morocco  and Cartagena.

His works have been screened or exhibited at leading festivals and events, including the IDFA, Locarno International Film Festival, Rotterdam, La Biennale di Venezia - Orizzonti, Oberhausen, the Guggenheim, Videobrasil, MACBA- Museu de Arte Contemporânea de Barcelona, MoMA, Panorama da Arte Brasileira no MAM-SP  and Bienal de São Paulo.

He has done artistic residencies at Videoformes, France, through Videobrasil, and at the Wexner Center for the Arts (USA). In April 2016, the first retrospective of his work was held at the Film Society of Lincoln Center, in New York City (USA).

Career

Gabriel Mascaro was born in Recife, the capital of the State of Pernambuco, Northeastern Brazil, on September 24, 1983. He holds a degree in Social Communication from the Federal University of Pernambuco (UFPE).

He began his career in 2008 with the documentary KFZ-1348, which he co-directed with the filmmaker Marcelo Pedroso. Ostensibly a search to track down the former owners of a Volkswagen Beetle registered under the license plate KFZ-1348, the film takes the car as its main device and approaches the lives of its owners as a privileged window onto Brazilian society. The documentary won the Special Jury Prize at the 32nd São Paulo International Film Festival.

His next film, High-rise (Um Lugar ao Sol) (2009), introduced him to a wider variety of international festivals, with screenings at over thirty events, including BAFICI and Visions du Rèel. High-rise steps into the private worlds of those living in luxury penthouses in Recife, Rio de Janeiro and São Paulo. The film uses interviews with these residents to fuel a debate on desire, visibility, insecurity, status and power, and to develop a sensorial discourse on Brazilian social and architectural paradigms. According to the Los Angeles Weekly, the film “effortlessly provokes thoughts on inequality, satisfaction and oblivion”. In Brazil, the documentary proved controversial, with some questioning the ethics of its approach to the interviewees.

In 2010, Mascaro launched another documentary, Avenida Brasília Formosa. “It’s a film about the disconnect between urban planning policy and the dreams and desires of the city folk”, wrote the film critic Carlos Minuano. The film debuted on the Bright Future program at the Rotterdam Festival, which also awarded him a script-development grant for Neon Bull (2015) through the Hubert Bals Fund.

In 2012, Mascaro released his best-known documentary, Housemaids (Doméstica), in which he handed the camera over to seven teenagers tasked with filming their respective housemaids for the period of one week so that the director could turn the raw footage into a finished film. The final result sparked widespread debate among critics and researchers. Strategically released in commercial cinemas on Labour Day, Housemaids was considered “a historic documentary”. The film premiered abroad at the 2012 edition of the International Documentary Film Festival Amsterdam. It won awards at the main Brazilian festivals, such as Brasília, Panorama de Cinema  and Cachoeiradoc. Writing in the Estado de São Paulo newspaper, film critic Luis Carlos Merten said that “No other film does nearly as much as Housemaids to portray a reality long seared into the Brazilian unconscious”.
In parallel, Mascaro launched the short-film Ebb and Flow (A onda traz, o vento leva) (2012), a documentary that portrays the everyday life of Rodrigo, a deaf man whose job is to instal sound systems in cars. The project for the documentary received an ArtAids  award in 2011 and, upon release, was screened at the Barcelona Museum of Contemporary Art and at numerous festivals, including the IDFA and the Festival de Brasília, where it won the best editing prize.

Mascaro's first fiction feature-film was released in 2014. August Winds had its international debut at the Locarno Festival, and received the best film prize at the Festival Internacional du Film d'Amiens and best photography and best actress awards at the 47th Festival de Brasília. The film accompanies Shirley, who leaves the big city for the quiet life in a small seaside town in order to look after her sick grandmother. She works as a tractor driver on a coconut farm, where, despite the isolation, she develops a taste for punk rock and dreams of becoming a tattoo artist.

The following year Mascaro brought out his second narrative feature, Neon Bull (Boi Neon) (2015), co-produced with Uruguayan and Dutch production companies. Neon Bull premiered at the Venice Festival's Mostra Orizzonti  and went on to show at the Toronto International Film Festival. Its Brazilian debut was at the Rio Film Festival, where it won four prizes. At the Marrakech Festival, Mascaro received the best director award from the hands of director Francis Ford Coppola, one of the jurors at the event.

The film earned Mascaro international recognition and acclaim amongst film critics. A vocal fan of the film, singer/songwriter Caetano Veloso wrote about Neon Bull for the American press (republished in the Folha de São Paulo newspaper), calling the film a “unique cinematographic work”. For Veloso, “It’s a poem of genders and the proximity between animal and human life (…) a humanity that strives for social ascension, but also for the sublime”. Chief film critic with Indiewire, Eric Kohn described the film as “Lyrically involving and deeply sensual”, and declared it “the great discovery of this year’s Toronto Festival”. He further discussed the film's originality in a second article entitled: “How Gabriel Mascaro invented a new kind of cinema”.

The film's critical acclaim fuelled interest in the director's filmography. In April 2016, the curator Dennis Lim organised a retrospective at the Lincoln Center (New York) entitled “Ebbs and Flows”, featuring all of Mascaro's feature-length work since High-Rise. Neon Bull was shown during the New Directors/New Films Festival, also at the Lincoln Center.

In Brazil, Mascaro belongs to a recent generation of filmmakers making waves on the international circuit, including Kleber Mendonça Filho, Marcelo Gomes, Cláudio Assis (also from the State of Pernambuco) and Karin Ainouz. Pernambuco first registered on the international cultural scene in the 90s with the Manguebeat music movement, and is currently enjoying an independent cinema boom.

In 2019, Mascaro's fiction film Divino Amor (Divine Love) was premiered at the Sundance and Berlinale Festivals, with The Hollywood Reporter and Screen International both picking it as one of the best films of that year.

Filmography

References

External links

Gabriel Mascaro's Web site in English

1983 births
Living people
Brazilian film directors
People from Recife